Zdeněk of Sternberg (or Zdeněk of Šternberk, 1410 – 4 December 1476 in Wiener Neustadt) was a Bohemian noble, diplomat and politician from the Sternberg family.

References

Sternberg family
1410 births
1476 deaths